Ebbw Vale South is a community and electoral ward in Blaenau Gwent, South Wales, including the south of the town of Ebbw Vale. 

It was formed in 2010 from part of that community. The population in 2011 was 4,274.

Governance
Ebbw Vale South is also an electoral ward, coterminous with the community, which elects two councillors to Blaenau Gwent County Borough Council.

A few days after being elected as an Independent councillor for the ward at the 2022 local election, Carl Bainton caused some controversy by changing his allegiance to Labour. The ward was subsequently represented by two Labour councillors.

References 

Communities in Blaenau Gwent
Ebbw Vale
Wards of Blaenau Gwent